Frank, Peter, Albert and Laidley Burge were an Australian family of footballing brothers who represented Australia at rugby union and rugby league between 1907 and 1922.

Frank Burge
Peter Burge
Albert Burge
Laidley Burge